Nathan Aldis was an early settler of Dedham, Massachusetts who served on that town's Board of Selectmen in 1641, 1642, and 1644. He served in a variety of other positions in the town and served as a deacon at First Church and Parish in Dedham. He signed the Dedham Covenant.

In 1642, John Elderkin sold half of his rights to the mill on Mother Brook to Nathaniel Whiting and the other half to John Allin, Aldis, and John Dwight.  They operated the mill "in a rather stormy partnership" until 1649 when Whiting became the sole owner.

Aldis and his wife Mary were the parents of John Aldis and ancestors of Asa O. Aldis. His daughter, Mary, married Joshua Fisher. His prosperity diminished in his later years.

Notes

References

Works cited

 

Dedham, Massachusetts selectmen
People from colonial Dedham, Massachusetts
Deacons at First Church and Parish in Dedham
Signers of the Dedham Covenant